Swordsmen in Double Flag Town or The Swordsman in Double Flag Town is a 1991 Chinese film directed by He Ping, starring Gao Wei and Zhang Manna.  It is a hybrid sort of Western and wuxia film, acted by a cast of largely unknowns, and was produced by Xi'an Film Studio.

Plot
A quiet teenage boy about sixteen to seventeen, Hai Ge (Gao Wei), ventures to Western China at the edge of the Gobi Desert to claim his bride, betrothed to him since birth.  His father has just died and the lad makes his way to Double Flag Town, the dusty border town with no marshal or governor to keep its townsfolk safe.  Along his way he meets Desert Eagle, a fighter who allegedly robs the rich to feed the poor.  Desert Eagle invites him to look him up in case he encounters any trouble.

Hai Ge manages to find young Hao Mei (Zhang Manna), his betrothed, and her father, who is lame in one leg and who runs a restaurant in the town.  At first Hao Mei feels disgusted by the dirty, unkempt boy, but gradually succumbs to his taciturn charms.  It appears also that Hai Ge has inherited martial arts skills from his late father—he keeps the long daggers in his boots which once made his late father a consummate fighter.

One day, a group of bandits appear in the restaurant and one attempts rape on Hao Mei.  Hai Ge intervenes and with his deft skills manages to kill the assailant.  The dead man is none other than the second brother of renowned desert bandit Lethal Swordsman.  After marrying his daughter to Hai Ge, Hao Mei's father tries to let the two run off, but the townsfolk insist that Hai Ge be handed over to Lethal Swordsman to prevent a town bloodbath.  To fight Lethal Swordsman, Hai Ge goes to find Desert Eagle, who promises he will be there to slay the bandit.  He promises to turn up at high noon two days later when the bandits appear.

On the fateful day Lethal Swordsman and his gang of bandits ride to Double Flag Town in the heat of noon.  Heading for a showdown, the chief slays everyone in his way attempting to block his revenge mission, including Hao Mei's father.  Lethal Swordsman faces off with Hai Ge who realizes he has been tricked by Desert Eagle, who does not turn up.  The two has a swift showdown.  As blood trickles down Hai Ge's head Lethal Swordsman makes off, impressed by the young man's skills.  As he moves away slowly, he suddenly realizes he is fatally wounded by Hai Ge's daggers and slumps to his death.  At this point Desert Eagle appears and claims his spoil—Lethal Swordsman's sword, as Hai Ge walks away wearily, stating that Desert Eagle has betrayed him.

The closing shot shows the silhouettes of Hai Ge and his bride riding away from Double Flag Town during sunset.

External links

1991 films
1990s adventure drama films
1991 Western (genre) films
Chinese adventure films
Films set in China
1990s Mandarin-language films
Films directed by He Ping
Wuxia films
1991 drama films